Jeanine Meerapfel (born 14 June 1943) is a German-Argentine film director and screenwriter. She has directed twenty films since 1966. In 1984, she was a member of the jury at the 34th Berlin International Film Festival.

She was born in 1943, in Buenos Aires, Argentina, and moved to Ulm, Germany in 1964 to study at the Institute for Film at the Academy of Art and Design. In 1981, her debut feature film Malou was an autobiographical story of a woman's life in Germany, France and Argentina. The film won the FIPRESCI prize at the Cannes Film Festival, as well as awards at the San Sebastián International Film Festival. Critics noted that Malou'''s style was distinct from other autobiographical feminist films in New German Cinema. Her 1987 film Days to Remember was entered into the 37th Berlin International Film Festival.

Selected filmography
  (1981)
  (1985)
 Days to Remember (1987)
 The Girlfriend (1988)
  (1989)
 Amigomío (1994)
 Mosconi - oder wem gehört die Welt (2007)
 The German Friend'' (2012)

References

External links

1943 births
Living people
Argentine film directors
Film people from Baden-Württemberg
German women film directors
Members of the Academy of Arts, Berlin
People from Buenos Aires